Andrés Miguel Garrone (born 13 May 1976) is an Argentine retired footballer.

References

Argentine footballers
Living people
1976 births
Association football forwards
Rosario Central footballers
Central Córdoba de Rosario footballers